Wielka Łąka  is a village in the administrative district of Gmina Kowalewo Pomorskie, within Golub-Dobrzyń County, Kuyavian-Pomeranian Voivodeship, in north-central Poland. It has a church, bus stop, park, small grocery store, and approximately 40 houses. The named, main road connected to the village is called DK15.

References

Villages in Golub-Dobrzyń County